Polecat Creek is a stream in Clay County in the U.S. state of Missouri. It is a tributary of Wilkerson Creek.

Polecat Creek was named for the polecats which roamed along its course.

See also
List of rivers of Missouri

References

Rivers of Clay County, Missouri
Rivers of Missouri